Diuris platichila, commonly known as the Blue Mountains doubletail, is a species of orchid that is endemic to a few isolated places in the Blue Mountains in New South Wales. It has two leaves and up to eight yellow flowers with dark markings on the dorsal sepal and labellum. It has relatively long, thin lateral sepals and the central lobe of the labellum is wedge-shaped. It forms hybrids with other species of Diuris.

Description
Flowering occurs in September and October.

Taxonomy and naming
Diuris platichila was first formally described in 1888 by Robert FitzGerald and the description was published in his book Australian Orchids.

Distribution and habitat
The Blue Mountains doubletail grows in isolated populations in the Blue Mountains. It was previously more common in the area but has declined due to habitat loss and hybridisation with other species, including D. chryseopsis and D. bracteata.

References

platichila
Endemic orchids of Australia
Orchids of New South Wales
Plants described in 1888